The Bobsleigh 1964 Winter Olympics events took place between 31 January and 7 February 1964 at Bob und Rodelbahn Igls, Innsbruck, Austria. This marked the return of Bobsleigh to the Winter Olympics as no bob events took place at the 1960 Winter Olympics.

Events

Medal table

References

External links
1964 bobsleigh two-man results
1964 bobsleigh four-man results

 
1964 Winter Olympics
1964 Winter Olympics events
Olympics
Bobsleigh in Austria